The following is a list of the 73 municipalities (comuni) of the Province of Rieti, Lazio, Italy.

List

See also
List of municipalities of Italy

References

Rieti